Lebedyansky (masculine), Lebedyanskaya (feminine), or Lebedyanskoye (neuter) may refer to:
Lebedyansky District, a district of Lipetsk Oblast, Russia
Lebedyansky (company), a Russian multi-national company owned by PepsiCo